Lick Creek is a tributary of Brown Creek in Anson County, North Carolina that rises southwest of Gordon Mountain and then flows north to meet Brown Creek near Mineral Springs, North Carolina. The watershed is about 67% forested, 30% agricultural and the rest is of other land uses.

See also
List of North Carolina rivers

References

Rivers of North Carolina
Rivers of Anson County, North Carolina
Tributaries of the Pee Dee River